Mamure is a village in the Düzce District of Düzce Province in Turkey. Its population is 344 (2022). The village is populated by Kurds.

References

Villages in Düzce District
Kurdish settlements in East Marmara Region